Kings Mountain is a small suburban city within the Charlotte metropolitan area in Cleveland and Gaston counties, North Carolina, United States. Most of the city is in Cleveland County, with a small eastern portion in Gaston County.  The population was 10,296 at the 2010 census.

History
Originally the settlement was called White Plains, but the city was incorporated on October 16, 1874, and the name was changed. It was decided that "Kings Mountain" would be a more appropriate name since the community was close to the site of the historic 1780 Battle of Kings Mountain in York County, South Carolina, a turning point in the American Revolutionary War.

The Battle of Kings Mountain was proclaimed as "the turning point of the American Revolution" by Thomas Jefferson. Liberty Mountain, a play performed at the local theater, recounts the events of the battle. The downtown area is home to the museum, police station, and the Mauney Memorial Library.

The Central School Historic District, King Street Overhead Bridge, Margrace Mill Village Historic District, Jacob S. Mauney Memorial Library and Teacher's Home, Southern Railway Company Overhead Bridge, and West End Historic District are listed on the National Register of Historic Places.

Geography

Kings Mountain is located at  (35.244105, -81.342544).

Kings Pinnacle is a small mountain located at the southeastern point of the city. Standing at 1,705 feet, it is the highest point in the Kings Mountain Belt of monadnock formations. It is one of the two mountains in Crowders Mountain State Park, where cleared trails lead to the pinnacle.

Demographics

2020 census

As of the 2020 United States census, there were 11,142 people, 4,151 households, and 2,536 families residing in the city.

2010 census
As of the census of 2010, there were 10,296 people, 4,597 households, and 2,674 families residing in the city. The population density was 1,187.1 people per square mile (458.1/km2). There were 4,064 housing units at an average density of 497.7 per square mile (192.1/km2). The racial makeup of the city was 74.85% White, 21.55% black, 0.15% Native American, 1.81% Asian, 0.02% Pacific Islander, 0.63% from other races, and 0.99% from two or more races. Hispanic or Latino of any race were 1.43% of the population.

There were 3,821 households, out of which 30.7% had children under the age of 18 living with them, 49.4% were married couples living together, 17.2% had a female householder with no husband present, and 30.0% were non-families. Of all households, 26.8% were made up of individuals, and 12.6% had someone living alone who was 65 years of age or older. The average household size was 2.47 and the average family size was 2.98.

In the city, the population was spread out, with 25.3% under the age of 18, 7.4% from 18 to 24, 27.3% from 25 to 44, 22.4% from 45 to 64, and 17.6% who were 65 years of age or older. The median age was 38 years. For every 100 females, there were 85.9 males. For every 100 females age 18 and over, there were 80.4 males.

The median income for a household in the city was $31,415, and the median income for a family was $39,137. Males had a median income of $32,444 versus $22,201 for females. The per capita income for the city was $15,920. About 13.4% of families and 19.2% of the population were below the poverty line, including 29.2% of those under age 18 and 20.7% of those age 65 or over.

Transportation
The interchange between Interstate 85, US Highway 74, and US Highway 29 is to the east of the city.

Kings Mountain is also served by two North Carolina State Highways: NC-161 with service to Bessemer City and York, and NC-216 with service to Cherryville.

Greyhound Lines began scheduled intercity bus service on April 20, 2010. The station is housed at Battleground Petroleum, 726 York Rd., off Interstate 85. The close proximity to I-85 was a major factor in relocating this station from nearby Gastonia, North Carolina.

Notable people 
 Otto Briggs (1891–1943), former professional baseball player
 Dremiel Byers (born 1974), Greco-Roman wrestler, World Champion and part of two Olympic teams (2008, 2012)
 Jake Early (1915–1985), former MLB player and All-Star selection
 Kevin Mack (born 1962), former NFL player and two-time Pro Bowl selection
 Tim Moore (born 1970), NC Speaker of the House
 John Henry Moss (1919–2009), Minor League Baseball executive and longtime Mayor of Kings Mountain
 Laura Moss (born 1973), actress
 Madisyn Shipman (born 2002), actress in Game Shakers
 Sandor Teszler (1903–2000), textile executive and philanthropist
 Jimmy Wayne (born 1972), country music singer and songwriter
 Will Wilson (born 1998), professional baseball shortstop in the San Francisco Giants organization

See also
 Battle of Kings Mountain
 Indian Motocycle Manufacturing Company
 Kings Mountain National Military Park
 Lincoln Academy
 Parker Hannifin

References

External links
 City of Kings Mountain official website

 
Cities in Cleveland County, North Carolina
Cities in Gaston County, North Carolina
Cities in North Carolina